Kurt Wegner (27 August 1908 - 16 September 1985) was a German artist born in Köln, Germany. He moved to Sweden in 1938, and died in Järna.

External links
 Föreningen Kurt Wegners Konst(Swedish)

1908 births
1985 deaths
Artists from Cologne